Paderborn Hauptbahnhof is the main passenger station in the city of Paderborn in the German state of North Rhine-Westphalia. It is located on the Hamm–Warburg line, part of the Mid-Germany Connection from Cologne or Düsseldorf to Thuringia and Saxony. The Senne Railway branches off to Bielefeld in Paderborn.

History 
The railway between Hamm and Paderborn was opened on 1 October 1850 by the Royal Westphalian Railway Company. The line was extended to Warburg in 1853. The Senne Railway was opened in July 1902. The Alme Valley Railway was opened in 1899 towards Büren; it was closed in 1981. Recently there was an attempt to reopen the line to provide a link to Paderborn Lippstadt Airport.

Operations 
Several long-distance trains on InterCity line 50 stop at Paderborn. Regional services operate on several Regional-Express and  Regionalbahn lines through Paderborn. In addition, Hanover S-Bahn services terminate at the station.

Location
The station is only 500 metres from the city centre. PaderSprinter buses operate from Westerntor and Zentralstation bus stops next to the station, connecting to the centre as well as most other parts of the city. Regional buses run from the bus station to nearby towns (including Delbrück, Hövelhof, Bad Lippspringe, Büren and Warburg).

Access 
Only platforms 1 to 3 are accessible by lift. There is a wheelchair lift (operated by rail staff) on the stairs to platforms 4 and 5, which are served by Regionalbahn trains to and from Herford, Bielefeld and Holzminden.

Transport Associations 
Paderborn is part of the Paderborn-Höxter Regional Transport Association (Nahverkehrsverbund Paderborn-Höxter).

References

External links 

Track plan of Paderborn Hbf on the website of Deutsche Bahn  (PDF; 235,7 KB)

Railway stations in North Rhine-Westphalia
Hannover S-Bahn stations
Railway stations in Germany opened in 1850
1850 establishments in Prussia
Buildings and structures in Paderborn (district)